Florence shooting may refer to:

2011 Florence shootings, in Italy
2018 Florence shooting, in Italy
Florence, South Carolina shooting, in 2018 in the United States